Do You Believe in Gosh? is the third live album from stand-up comedian Mitch Hedberg. It was released September 9, 2008. The album is a posthumous release, having been recorded two months before his death on March 30, 2005. The album was recorded in Ontario, California.

Track listing
"The Improv Fairy Tale" – 3:40
"Door Deal" – 2:28
"Hot Air Balloon" – 2:57
"Headless Horseman" – 2:57
"Hotels and Beds" – 3:57
"Phil" – 3:23
"Restaurants" – 2:22
"Texas and Sea Food" – 2:54
"Tea Ski" – 3:23
"Canal Smarts" – 2:18
"The Vacuumist" – 2:34
"Belt" – 3:30
"Soda Pop" – 3:17

Personnel
Mitch Hedberg – Performer
Steve Rossiter – Engineer
Lynn Shawcroft – Liner Notes, Executive Producer, Photography, Illustrations
Ian Stearns – Associate Producer
Jack Vaughn – Producer

References

External links
 Time Out New York feature by Julie Seabaugh

Live albums published posthumously
2008 live albums
Comedy Central Records live albums
Stand-up comedy albums
Spoken word albums by American artists
Live spoken word albums
Mitch Hedberg albums
2000s comedy albums